The McDonnell Douglas (later Boeing) X-36 Tailless Fighter Agility Research Aircraft was an American stealthy subscale prototype jet designed to fly without the traditional empennage found on most aircraft. This configuration was designed to reduce weight, drag and radar cross section, and increase range, maneuverability and survivability.

Design and development

The X-36 was built to 28% scale of a possible fighter aircraft, and was controlled by a pilot in a ground-based virtual cockpit with a view provided by a video camera mounted in the canopy of the aircraft.

For control, a canard forward of the wing was used as well as split ailerons and an advanced thrust vectoring nozzle for directional control. The X-36 was unstable in both pitch and yaw axes, so an advanced digital fly-by-wire control system was used to provide stability.

First flown on 17 May 1997, it made 31 successful research flights. It handled very well, and the program is reported to have met or exceeded all project goals.  McDonnell Douglas merged with Boeing in August 1997 while the test program was in progress; the aircraft is sometimes referred to as the Boeing X-36.

The X-36 possessed high maneuverability that would be ideal for use as a fighter. Despite its potential suitability, and highly successful test program, there have been no reports regarding further development of the X-36 or any derived design as of 2017.

Survivors
The first X-36 is at the National Museum of the United States Air Force at Wright-Patterson Air Force Base near Dayton, Ohio. It arrived on July 16, 2003, the same day as the Boeing Bird of Prey and is displayed in the Museum's Research & Development Gallery.
The second X-36 is displayed outside the Air Force Test Flight Center Museum at Edwards Air Force Base in California.

Specifications (X-36)

See also

References

External links

 NASA fact sheet on the X-36 Tailless Fighter Agility Research Aircraft
 "X-36 Proving Its Agility In Flight Testing". Boeing, 1997.
 Boeing X-36 (1997): Tailless Agility  Aviation Week & Space Technology

X-36, McDonnell Douglas
Canard aircraft
X-36
Aircraft first flown in 1997
Mid-wing aircraft
Single-engined jet aircraft
Two dimension thrust vectoring aircraft
Stealth aircraft